The Central African Republic is a landlocked nation within the interior of the African continent. It is bordered by  Cameroon, Chad, Sudan, South Sudan, the Democratic Republic of the Congo and the Republic of the Congo. In the northeast are the Fertit Hills, and there are scattered hills in the southwestern part of the country.

At , the Central African Republic is the world's 45th-largest country (after Somalia). It is comparable in size to Ukraine.

Much of the southern border is formed by tributaries of the Congo River, with the Mbomou River in the east merging with the Uele River to form the Ubangi River. In the west, the Sangha River flows through part of the country. The eastern border lies along the edge of the Congo-Nile watershed.

Estimates of the amount of the country covered by forest range up to 8%, with the densest parts in the south. The forest is highly diverse and includes commercially important species of Ayous, Sapele and Sipo. The deforestation rate is 0.4% per annum, and lumber poaching is commonplace.

Climate 

The climate of the Central African Republic is generally a tropical savanna climate (Köppen Aw), although there are areas with a tropical monsoon climate (Köppen Am) and in the north there is also a hot semi-arid climate (Köppen BSh). There is a wet season and a dry season, and the temperature is hot throughout the year. The northern areas are subject to harmattan winds, which are hot, dry, and carry dust. The tip of the northern regions have been subject to desertification. The remainder of the country is prone to flooding from nearby rivers. About one third of the Central African Republic's population do not have access to clean water.

Notes 

Location:
Central Africa, north of Democratic Republic of the Congo

Area - comparative:
Slightly smaller than Somalia
Slightly larger than Ukraine

Land boundaries:
total:
5,920 km
border countries:
Cameroon 901 km, Chad 1,556 km, Democratic Republic of the Congo 1,747 km, Republic of the Congo 487 km, Sudan 174 km and South Sudan 1,055 km

Coastline:
0 km (landlocked)

Terrain:
vast, flat to rolling, monotonous plateau; scattered hills in northeast and southwest

Elevation extremes:
lowest point:
Oubangui River 335 m
highest point:
Mont Ngaoui 1,420 m

Natural resources:
diamonds, uranium, timber, gold, petroleum, hydropower

Land use:
arable land:
2.89%
permanent crops:
0.13%
other:
96.98% (2012 est.)

Irrigated land:
1.35 km2 (2003)

Total renewable water resources:
144.4 km3 (2011)

Freshwater withdrawal (domestic/industrial/agricultural):
total:
0.07 km3/yr (83%/17%/1%)
per capita:
17.42 m3/yr (2005)

Natural hazards:
hot, dry, dusty harmattan winds affect northern areas; floods are common

Environment - current issues:
tap water is not potable; poaching has diminished its reputation as one of the last great wildlife refuges; desertification

Environment - international agreements:
party to:
Biodiversity, Climate Change, Desertification, Endangered Species, Hazardous Wastes, Nuclear Test Ban, Ozone Layer Protection, Tropical Timber 94, Wetlands
signed, but not ratified:
Law of the Sea

Geography - note:
landlocked; almost the precise center of Africa

Extreme points 

This is a list of the extreme points of the Central African Republic, the points that are farther north, south, east or west than any other location.

Northernmost point - unnamed location in the Aoukal river on the border with Chad, Vakaga Prefecture
Easternmost point - unnamed location immediately East of the tripoint with South Sudan and the Democratic Republic of the Congo and south of the town of Ezo in South Sudan, Haut-Mbomou Prefecture
Southernmost point - the tripoint with Cameroon and the Republic of Congo, Sangha-Mbaéré Prefecture
Westernmost point - unnamed location on the border with Cameroon west of the town of Koundé in Central African Republic near Cameroon's Lokoti to Garoua Boulai road, Nana-Mambéré Prefecture

References 

 

pt:República Centro-Africana#Geografia